Plobsheim ( or) is a commune in the Bas-Rhin department in Grand Est in north-eastern France.

List of mayors

Twin town
  Port-Sainte-Foy-et-Ponchapt, France

See also
 Communes of the Bas-Rhin department

References

External links

Communes of Bas-Rhin
Bas-Rhin communes articles needing translation from French Wikipedia